The 1919–20 PCHA season was the ninth season of the professional men's ice hockey Pacific Coast Hockey Association (PCHA) league. Season play ran from December 26, 1919, to March 10, 1920. The season was enlarged to 22 games per team. The Seattle Metropolitans club finished first during the regular season and then won the playoff with the Vancouver Millionaires to take the PCHA championship. The Mets then played in the 1920 Stanley Cup Finals against the National Hockey League (NHL) champion Ottawa Senators. The Senators won the best-of-five series three games to two.

League business
At the league's annual meeting on November 21, 1919, Frank Patrick was re-elected as PCHA president.

Several players retired, including Si Griffis, Barney Stanley, and Mickey MacKay of Vancouver, and Ran McDonald of Seattle. Three players from Stanley Cup champion Toronto of the NHL moved to the PCHA this season: Alf Skinner, Jack Adams, and Harry Meeking.

Regular season

Final standings
Note: W = Wins, L = Losses, T = Ties, GF= Goals For, GA = Goals against
Teams that qualified for the playoffs are highlighted in bold

Schedule and results

Source: Coleman (1966)

Player statistics

Goaltending averages

Scoring leaders

Source: Toronto World, March 19, 1920.

Playoffs
Seattle and Vancouver met for the third straight year in the playoffs to decide the PCHA championship. Vancouver won the first game 3–0 at Seattle, but Seattle struck back in Vancouver, defeating the Millionaires 6–0 to win the championship and advance to the Stanley Cup Finals in Ottawa. Gordon Roberts of Vancouver played his last professional game in the first game and scored a goal.

Source: Coleman (1966)

Stanley Cup Finals

Ottawa won the first two games of the series. After Jack Darragh scored the game-winning goal in their 3–2 victory in game one, goaltender Clint Benedict led the Senators to a 3–0 shutout win in game two. Seattle won game three, 3–1, before the series was shifted to Toronto because of Ottawa's slushy ice conditions (the Ottawa Arena did not have artificial ice). Frank Foyston then scored twice to lead the Mets to a 5–2 victory in game four to even the series. In the fifth game, Darragh recorded a hat-trick to lead the Senators to a 6–1 win to clinch the Cup.

Source: Coleman (1966)

See also
1919–20 NHL season

References

Notes

Bibliography

 
Pacific Coast Hockey Association seasons
2
PCHA